Faithful is a book co-written by Stephen King and Stewart O'Nan. It chronicles exchanges between King and O'Nan about the 2004 Boston Red Sox season, beginning with an e-mail in the summer of 2003, and throughout the 2004 season, from spring training to the World Series.

The book was dedicated to Victoria Snelgrove, an Emerson College student who was struck in the eye by a projectile fired by the Boston Police Department during crowd-control actions near Fenway Park following Game 7 of the American League Championship Series, resulting in her death approximately 12 hours later.

On May 4, 2007, The Boston Globe reported that HBO would be adapting the book into a six-part miniseries for 2008. In September 2008, King wrote, "The script is just goddamn hilarious." There is, however, no indication that such a miniseries was actually made.

References

Major League Baseball books
Boston Red Sox
Non-fiction books by Stephen King